Thimister-Clermont is a municipality of Wallonia located in the province of Liège, Belgium. 

On January 1, 2006, Thimister-Clermont had a total population of 5,296. The total area is 28.69 km2 which gives a population density of 185 inhabitants per km2.

The municipality consists of the following districts: Clermont-sur-Berwinne, and Thimister. Clermont-sur-Berwinne is a member of the Les Plus Beaux Villages de Wallonie ("The Most Beautiful Villages of Wallonia") association.

See also
 List of protected heritage sites in Thimister-Clermont

References

External links
 

Municipalities of Liège Province